Cosmia elisae is a species of cutworm or dart moth in the family Noctuidae. It is found in North America.

The MONA or Hodges number for Cosmia elisae is 9814.1.

References

Further reading

 
 
 

Cosmia
Articles created by Qbugbot
Moths described in 2003